1911 (also known as Xinhai Revolution and The 1911 Revolution), is a 2011 Chinese historical drama film about the 1911 Revolution in China, produced to commemorate the revolution's 100th anniversary. Directed by Jackie Chan and Zhang Li, the film stars Chan in his 100th film as an actor, alongside an ensemble cast that includes Winston Chao, Li Bingbing, Joan Chen, Hu Ge, and Chan's son Jaycee Chan. It was released on 23 September 2011 in mainland China and on 29 September in Hong Kong; it also opened on the 24th Tokyo International Film Festival later in October.

1911 received mainly negative reviews from Western film critics, who criticized its unengaging propagandistic depiction of the revolution but commended its cinematography.

Plot
The story follows key events of the 1911 Revolution, with a focus on Huang Xing and Sun Yat-sen. It begins with the Wuchang Uprising of 1911 and follows through historical events such as the Second Guangzhou Uprising on 27 April 1911, the deaths of the 72 martyrs, the election of Sun Yat-sen as the provisional president of the new Provisional Republic of China, the abdication of the last Qing dynasty emperor Puyi on 12 February 1912, and Yuan Shikai becoming the new provisional president in Beijing on 10 March 1912.

Cast

Jackie Chan as revolutionary Huang Xing
Winston Chao as Sun Yat-sen
Li Bingbing as Xu Zonghan
Sun Chun as Yuan Shikai
Jaycee Chan as 
Hu Ge as Lin Juemin
Yu Shaoqun as Wang Jingwei
Joan Chen as Empress Dowager Longyu
Huang Zhizhong as 
Jiang Wu as Li Yuanhong
Ning Jing as Qiu Jin
Jiang Wenli as Soong Ching-ling
Mei Ting as Chen Yiying
Xing Jiadong as Song Jiaoren
Wei Zongwan as Aisin-Gioro Yikuang
Hu Ming as Liao Zhongkai
Iva Law as Consort Jin
Huo Qing as 
Qi Dao as 
Dennis To as 
Tao Zeru as Tang Weiyong
Wang Ziwen as Tang Manrou
Ye Daying as Wu Tingfang
Chen Yiheng as Xu Shichang
Tobgyal (Duobujie) as Feng Guozhang
Zhang Zhijian as Lin Sen
Xie Gang as Tang Shaoyi
Liu Zitian as Hu Hanmin
Sun Jingji as Yu Peilun
Michael Lacidonia as Homer Lea
Gao Bin as Cai Yuanpei
Wang Wang as Chen Qimei
Zhao Yaodong as Zhang Taiyan
Jia Hongwei as 
Su Hanye as Aisin-Gioro Puyi
Nan Kai as 
Tong Jun as 
Jiang Jing as Yuan Shikai's concubine
Wang Weiwei as Yuan Shikai's concubine
Wang Luyao as Yuan Shikai's concubine
Simon Dutton as John Jordan
He Xiang as Fang Shengdong
Lan Haoyu as 
Xu Ning as Chen Gengxin
Wei Xiaojun as Red Cross Society leader
Qin Xuan as Red Cross Society vice leader
He Qiang as Ju Zheng
Ma Yan as 
Wang Ya'nan as Yuan Keding
Zhang Xiaolin as 
Lü Yang as 
Tan Zengwei as 
Jack as Yubei'er
Li Dongxue as Zaifeng
Liu Guohua as Qing assassin
Wang Kan as 
Xu Wenguang as Zhang Mingqi
Zuo Zhaohe as Zheng Kun
Wang Jingfeng as 
James Lee Guy as the American representative
Maxiu as British representative
Canwu as the German representative
Duluye as French representative
Attarian as French representative

Production
Production started on 29 September 2010 in Fuxin, Liaoning, where a camera rolling ceremony was held. After half a year of intense production, it wrapped up on 20 March 2011 in Sanya, Hainan. It is Taiwanese actor Winston Chao's fifth portrayal of Chinese nationalist Sun Yat-sen, after the films The Soong Sisters (1997) and Road to Dawn (2007), and the television series Sun Zhongshan (2001) and Tie jian dan daoyi (2009).

Release
1911 was released on 23 September 2011 in China and on 29 September 2011 in Hong Kong. It opened the 24th Tokyo International Film Festival on 22 October 2011. It was released in its original version in North American theatres on 7 October 2011.

The film was unable to be released in Taiwan as it failed to meet the country's yearly 10-film quota on mainland China imports.

Box office
The film earned RMB18.1 million on its opening weekend in China. In Hong Kong, it earned only HK$1.0 million during its first six days in theaters.

Critical response

1911 received generally negative reviews from Western film critics; it holds  rating on Rotten Tomatoes. On Metacritic, which uses an average of critics' reviews, it holds 37 out of 100, indicating "generally unfavorable" reviews, e.g. on the Opionator.

Maggie Lee of The Hollywood Reporter largely criticized the film's "insipid, poorly structured screenplay", and wrote: "A mainland Chinese propaganda vehicle through and through, the film postulates history in such a scrappy, inaccessible manner that either as entertainment or education, it's a lost cause." Rachel Saltz of The New York Times described the film as "overly faithful" to being a commemorative work that honors the 1911 revolution, approaching the event "like a great, bloody historical pageant"; she concluded that despite its "excellent" cinematography and engaging early battle scenes, 1911 "remains a kind of lavishly illustrated history lesson." Stephen Cole of The Globe and Mail gave the film two out of four stars, criticizing its dour propagandistic depiction of the revolution, stating that "[Jackie] Chan’s film may be about a war and revolution staged in 1911, but it should feel like it was made in 2011. [...] If all his work was as solemn as 1911, he would never have made 100 movies."

Derek Elly of the now-defunct Film Business Asia gave 1911 a five out of ten, criticizing it overall as "routine" and "unengaging" with its actors' performances "lack[ing] any kind of spark", and unfavorably compared the film to The Founding of a Republic and The Founding of a Party. However, Elly considered the film's cinematography to be worthy of praise.

The Economist noted that while the film was endorsed by the Chinese government officials, ticket sales have been poor. It also noted that the film avoided sensitive topics, such as the reforms which led to the revolution.

See also
Other screen works about the 1911 Revolution:
Towards the Republic, a 2003 television series
1911 Revolution, a 2011 television series
72 Heroes, a 2011 film

References

External links
  (Asia)
 Official website (English)
 
 
 
 
 
 

2011 films
Works about the 1911 Revolution
2010s historical drama films
2011 drama films
2010s Cantonese-language films
Chinese historical drama films
Cultural depictions of Puyi
Cultural depictions of Sun Yat-sen
Films directed by Jackie Chan
Films set in 1911
Films set in 20th-century Qing dynasty
Films shot in China
Hong Kong drama films
Hong Kong historical films
Variance Films films
2010s Hong Kong films